In set theory, a branch of mathematics, an additively indecomposable ordinal α is any ordinal number that is not 0 such that for any  , we have    Additively indecomposable ordinals are also called gamma numbers or additive principal numbers.  The additively indecomposable ordinals are precisely those ordinals of the form  for some ordinal .

From the continuity of addition in its right argument, we get that if  and α is additively indecomposable, then 

Also,   is additively indecomposable, since the sum of two finite ordinals is still finite. More generally, every infinite initial ordinal (an ordinal corresponding to a cardinal number) is additively indecomposable.

The class of additively indecomposable numbers  is closed and unbounded.

The number   is therefore the first fixed point of the sequence

Multiplicatively indecomposable 
A similar notion can be defined for multiplication. If α is greater than the multiplicative identity, 1, and β < α and γ < α imply β·γ < α, then α is multiplicatively indecomposable. 2 is multiplicatively indecomposable since 1·1 = 1 < 2. Besides 2, the multiplicatively indecomposable ordinals (also called delta numbers) are those of the form  for any ordinal α. Every epsilon number is multiplicatively indecomposable; and every multiplicatively indecomposable ordinal (other than 2) is additively indecomposable. The delta numbers (other than 2) are the same as the prime ordinals that are limits.

Higher indecomposables 
Exponentially indecomposable ordinals are equal to the epsilon numbers, tetrationally indecomposable ordinals are equal to the zeta numbers (fixed points of ), and so on. Therefore, the Feferman-Schutte ordinal  (fixed point of ) is the first ordinal which is -indecomposable for all , where  denotes Knuth's up-arrow notation.

See also 
 Ordinal arithmetic

References

Ordinal numbers